Marie Williams may refer to:

 Marie Selika Williams (c. 1849–1937), American coloratura soprano
 Marie Victoria Williams (1882–1955), South African classicist